Nylatron is a tradename for a family of nylon plastics, typically filled with molybdenum disulfide lubricant powder. It is used to cast plastic parts for machines, because of its mechanical properties and wear-resistance.

Nylatron is a brand name of Mitsubishi Chemical Advanced Materials, Inc. and was originally developed and manufactured by Nippon Polypenco Limited.

Nylatron is used in several applications such as:
 rotary lever actuators where unusual shapes are required
 heavy-duty caster wheels, normally as a replacement for cast iron or forged steel
 plain bearing material, especially in screw conveyor applications

References

External links
 Matweb datasheets
 Nylatron Plastic Material Datasheets

Polymers